Picophagea, also known as Synchromophyceae, is a class of photosynthetic heterokonts. The chloroplast of the Synchromophyceae are surrounded by two membranes and arranged in a way where they share the outer pair of membranes. The entire chloroplast complex is surrounded by an additional two outer membranes.

Taxonomy
According to AlgaeBase, the class contains only two genera:
 Class Picophagea  [=Synchromophyceae ]
 Order Synchromales Horn & Ehlers 2007
 Family Synchromaceae Schnetter & Ehlers 2007
 Genus Synchroma Schnetter 2007  
 Order Chlamydomyxales 
 Family Chlamydomyxaceae 
 Genus Chlamydomyxa Archer 1875 
However, the latest revision recognizes an additional four genera: Chrysopodocystis, Guanochroma, Leukarachnion and Picophagus.

References

Ochrophyta
Heterokont classes